Connecticut's 122nd House of Representatives district elects one member of the Connecticut House of Representatives. It encompasses parts of Shelton, Stratford, and Trumbull. It has been represented by Republican Ben McGorty since 2014.

Recent elections

2020

2018

2016

2014

2014 special

2012

References

122